Rina Marsa (1904–?) was a Russian-born actress. She appeared in a number of German and Austrian films during the late 1920s and early 1930s in a mixture of lead and supporting roles. She was briefly married to Emilio Genís Varela, a Spanish Banker and Shipping Magnate

Selected filmography
 The Blue Mouse (1928)
 Yacht of the Seven Sins (1928)
 Secret Police (1929)
 Silence in the Forest (1929)
 Ludwig II, King of Bavaria (1929)
 Youthful Indiscretion (1929)
 Love and Champagne (1930)
 Of Life and Death (1930)
 The Uncle from Sumatra (1930)
 General Babka (1930)
 Poor as a Church Mouse (1931)
 No More Love (1931)
 Calais-Dover (1931)
 The Burning Secret (1933)

References

Bibliography
 Michelangelo Capua. Anatole Litvak: The Life and Films. McFarland, 2015.

External links
 

1904 births
Year of death unknown
German film actresses
German silent film actresses
20th-century German actresses
Russian film actresses
Russian silent film actresses
Place of death unknown
Emigrants from the Russian Empire to Germany